The Electric Hour is an American old-time radio program of popular music. It was broadcast on CBS from September 20, 1944, to June 9, 1946.

Format
Nelson Eddy starred in The Electric Hour, and each episode featured a guest star who sang duets with him. Genres featured included music from films, folk songs, and "ballads from many lands". Gail Lulay, Eddy's biographer, wrote in Nelson Eddy, America's Favorite Baritone: An Authorized Biographical Tribute, "This was Nelson's dream show because it had a musical format." Lulay added that the program contained "some of Nelson's best music".

Site
The program initially originated from CBS Columbia Square in Hollywood, California. Effective with the September 16, 1945, installment, it moved to the Walt Disney Studios in Burbank, California. A report in the trade publication Billboard said that the change was caused by "acute studio space shortage at CBS".

Personnel 
Eddy was the only regular featured performer on The Electric Hour. Guests included Jeanette MacDonald, who performed with Eddy in films. Instrumental music was provided by Robert Armbruster's orchestra, and Armbruster's chorus provided vocal support. Frank Graham was the announcer, and Charles Herbert was the producer.

Sponsor
The program's title came from its sponsor, a group of electric utilities across the United States. The organization had the slogan "local electric companies — all producing power for America under American business management." The number of participating utilities was 167 in 1945.

Summer versions
In 1945, 1946, and 1947, the same sponsors presented The Electric Hour Summer Series as replacements for regular programs. Dates and featured artists, which varied from year to year, are listed below:
July 8, 1945 - September 9, 1945 — Francia White and Felix Knight
June 9, 1946 - September 22, 1946 — Anne Jamison, Bob Shanley, and the Sportsmen Quartet
July 13, 1947 - August 31, 1947 — Woody Herman, Peggy Lee, and Dave Barbour's orchestra

References

External links

Logs
Log of episodes of The Electric Hour from Jerry Haendiges Vintage Radio Logs (scroll down below The Old Gold Show.
Log of episodes of The Electric Hour from Old Time Radio Researchers Group
Log of episodes of The Electric Hour from radioGOLDINdex

1944 radio programme debuts
1946 radio programme endings
1940s American radio programs
CBS Radio programs
American music radio programs